Jafarbagi-ye Olya (also Romanized as Ja‘farbagī-ye ‘Olyā) is a village in Khaveh-ye Jonubi Rural District, in the Central District of Delfan County, Lorestan Province, Iran. At the 2006 census, its population was 68, in 20 families.

References 

Towns and villages in Delfan County